Peterborough Rugby Club is an English rugby union team based in the city of Peterborough. The club runs two senior men's sides, an under-18 team, a senior ladies' team an under-18 girls' team and a full set of junior teams including under 16, 14 and 12 girls teams. The first XV currently plays in East Midlands Regional 2 - a level six league in the English rugby union system.

Club Honours
Midlands 3 East (north v south) promotion playoff winners: 2003-04
Midlands 2 (east v west) promotion playoff winners: 2005-06
Midlands 2 East (South) champions: 2016-17

References

External links
Official club website

English rugby union teams